Lani Tupu (born Auckland, New Zealand), billed variously as Larney Tupu, John Tupu and Lani John Tupu, is a New Zealand-born actor of Samoan and English descent. Also known as Lani Tupu Jr.

Biography 
Tupu was born in 1955 to an English mother and a Samoan father. Tupu was named after his father Lani Tupu. Tupu started acting in church plays. Tupu was educated at Rongotai College and Wellington Teachers' Training College. He was awarded a Queen Elizabeth II Arts Council Bursary in 1977 to enter New Zealand Drama School. Tupu's father was also called Lani and was also an actor. When Tupu graduated drama school in 1979 he was the first Samoan to do so. He then moved to Auckland and was in the Theatre Corporate company for three years, and then two years at the Mercury Theatre. He got a lead role in TV series Country GP where he played a Māori doctor.

Tupu moved to Australia to pursue other acting opportunities. Tupu's TV appearances include Impossible (1988), Time Trax (1993), The New Adventures of Flipper (1996), Farscape (1999–2003), Stingers (2002/2004) and Farscape: The Peacekeeper Wars (2004).

His movie appearances include Send a Gorilla (1988), The Punisher (1989), Marlin Bay (1992), Heart of Fire (1997),Lantana (2001), Liquid Bridge (2003), and Robotropolis (2011).

Tupu participated in the foundation of an Australian theatre group called The Walkers and Talkers along with other New Zealanders. Part of his work has involved as an acting coach and teaching in Australia and New Zealand. He also does voice work including on SBS.

In 1993 he was in the premiere of John Kneubuhl's play Think of a Garden in Auckland directed by Nathaniel Lees, which reviewers compared to Bruce Mason's The End of the Golden Weather as being iconic for New Zealand. His debut screen directing role was in New Zealand on Tala Pasifika in 1996, eight short films written by Lisa Taouma.

Mario Gaoa a Niu FM radio host and star of the Naked Samoans theatre company describes Tupu as one of one of three godfathers of Pacific theatre along with Jay Laga'aia and Nathaniel Lees.

Awards 
1986 Listener Film and Television Awards – Nominated for Best Supporting Actor: for Send a Gorilla

1984 Feltex Awards – Best New Talent: for Country GP

Filmography

Film

Television

References

External links

1955 births
Living people
New Zealand male television actors
New Zealand male film actors
New Zealand male stage actors
Australian male television actors
Australian male film actors
Australian male stage actors
Toi Whakaari alumni
People educated at Rongotai College
Actors of Samoan descent
New Zealand emigrants to Australia
New Zealand people of Samoan descent
New Zealand people of English descent